The Minnesota Swarm are a lacrosse team based in Saint Paul, Minnesota playing in the National Lacrosse League (NLL). The 2010 season was the 6th in franchise history.

The Swarm didn't have a strong start to the 2010 season, losing four of their first five games. But after winning four of their next five to even their record at 5-5, they lost their last six games of the season, three of them in overtime, to finish with a 5-11 record. Despite the .313 winning percentage, the Swarm made the playoffs ahead of the 4-12 Colorado Mammoth. But in the playoffs, their losing streak continued, as the eventual champion Washington Stealth eliminated them with a 14-10 victory.

Regular season

Conference standings

Game log
Reference:

Playoffs

Game log
Reference:

Transactions

New players
 Brock Boyle - acquired in trade
 Ryan Benesch - acquired in trade
 Ryan Hoff - acquired in trade
 Richard Morgan - acquired in trade
 Scott Self - acquired in trade
 Sean Thompson - acquired in trade
 Jay Thorimbert - acquired in trade
 Alex Turner - acquired in trade

Players not returning
 Ian Rubel - traded
 Ryan Ward - traded

Trades

Entry draft
The 2009 NLL Entry Draft took place on September 9, 2009. The Swarm selected the following players:

Roster

See also
2010 NLL season

References

Minnesota
2010 in sports in Minnesota